Redemption Paws is a Canadian dog rescue charity based in Toronto that was established in 2017. It was featured in a 2022 investigative report by the Toronto Star regarding concerns about the welfare of dogs rescued by the organisation.

Organization 
Redemption Paws is a Toronto-based non-profit and charity that relocates dogs from countries affected by climate change, natural disaster, or canine overpopulation. The organisation was founded in September 2017.

History and activities 

Redemption Paws reported $1 million in revenue in 2021 and reported rehoming almost 3,000 dogs from U.S shelters over a four year period. The organization has zero paid employees and is managed by CEO Nicole Simone. 

In 2021, the organisation rescued Elvado, a U.S. dog that was paralysed by a gunshot. During the COVID-19 pandemic the organization had a surplus of dogs up for adoption and launched Streamlined Adoption Month in August 2021.

In a March 2022 Toronto Star investigation, over 24 sources, including 19 staff and ex-voluteers, including a former executive director, reported a variety of concerns about the practices the organisation. An April 2022 Toronto Star investigative report profiled the experience of one rescue dog and the Redemption Paws "Dogs From Away" project, which sent rescue dogs to Newfoundland.

References

External links 
 Official website

2017 establishments in Ontario
Animal rescue groups
Charities based in Canada
Animal charities based in Canada
Animal welfare organizations based in Canada